Matthew Owies (born 19 March 1997) is an Australian rules footballer and former basketballer playing for the Carlton Football Club in the Australian Football League (AFL).

Raised in Melbourne, Owies played junior football for Camberwell Sharks and school football for St Kevin's, but was also a skilled basketballer, and at age 15 he switched his primary focus to basketball. As a point guard, Owies represented Australia at he 2014 FIBA Under-17 World Championship, and played for the Dandenong Rangers in the South East Australian Basketball League.

Following his junior success, Owies received an athletic scholarship to play NCAA men's basketball for the Hawaii Rainbow Warriors. He played with the Rainbow Warriors as a true freshman in the 2016–17 season; he then sat out the 2017–18 season to transfer to the Seattle Redhawks.

During 2018, Owies opted to return to Australia and football, and signed with the Carlton Football Club at the end of the 2018 season as a Category B rookie, a category for players who have not been registered with a football club for at least three years. After almost two years of development as a small marking forward, Owies made his senior AFL debut on 8 September 2020 against the Sydney Swans at Metricon Stadium, the only game he played for the season. Owies' next game came early in the 2021 season, in which he kicked his first career goal in a three-goal performance against Essendon.

Owies currently studies a Bachelor of Exercise and Sport Science at Deakin University.

References

External links

Basketball profile from University of Hawai'i

1997 births
Living people
Carlton Football Club players
Australian rules footballers from Victoria (Australia)
Hawaii Rainbow Warriors basketball players
Australian men's basketball players
People educated at St Kevin's College, Melbourne